William Thorowgood (died 1877) was a British typographer and type founder.

On the death of its founder Robert Thorne in 1820, Thorowgood bought the Fann Street Foundry.

He was active in the development of Sans Serif.

References

1877 deaths
British typographers and type designers
Year of birth unknown